The L Tower (also known as the Libeskind Tower) is a residential skyscraper in Toronto, Ontario, Canada designed by architect Daniel Libeskind. The project, which broke ground in mid-October 2009, saw many delays. One cause for delay was a stop-work order caused by safety concerns about the crane at the top of the building. The crane was also an eyesore for many residents. Despite the cranes (which were removed by May 2016 and September 2018 respectively), the building still won the eighth place Emporis Skyscraper Award in 2017.

In the 2000s, the Sony Centre (then known as the Hummingbird Centre) was expected to be demolished and the land sold; however, Hummingbird Centre CEO Dan Brambilla convinced the city to preserve the site and approve the condo development.

Developers
The building is being developed by three builders: Cityzen and Castlepoint Numa of Toronto, and Fernbrook Homes of Concord, Ontario.

Sony Plaza and public art
The Sony Plaza is an open space elevated above the intersection of Yonge and Front streets. It is being designed by Claude Cormier and Associates.

Canadian artist Harley Valentine is creating a triptych of sculptures to be installed in the Sony Plaza. Called Dream Ballet in hommage to the National Ballet of Canada's four-decade residence at the site, the three sculptures depict abstracted ballet dancers in various dynamic positions.

Honor
In 2017, the L Tower was awarded an Emporis Skyscraper Award in the number 8 spot in the category of best new skyscraper.

Controversy
In June 2015, Ontario's Ministry of Labour began investigating the L Tower's work site due to complaints about its partially assembled crane. A stop-work order was issued, and engineering reports were ordered to confirm the crane was structurally sound before continuing work; due at the end of July, these reports were not provided. The crane's operator resigned after he felt his concerns that the crane could collapse were being ignored by the construction manager, and the business manager of IUOE Local 793 stated: "We don’t believe we should be rolling the dice on a custom-made lifting device over the heads of the good people of Toronto."

In February 2018, former members of a number of condominium boards—including L Tower—were accused of misusing funds, resulting in litigation. Two members of the L Tower's condominium board resigned as a result.

See also
 List of tallest buildings in Toronto
List of tallest buildings in Canada
 Sony Centre for the Performing Arts

References

Residential skyscrapers in Toronto
Modernist architecture in Canada
Residential condominiums in Canada
Daniel Libeskind buildings
Residential buildings completed in 2016